William Bachrach (May 15, 1879 in Chicago, Illinois – July 1959) was an American swimming and water polo coach.

Early life
Bachrach was Jewish, and one of 16 children.  In the 1890s, he was a competitive swimmer.  He served in the Spanish–American War.  Later in life, the 6 foot tall Bachrach weighed 300 pounds.

Coaching career

As a coach, Bachrach was called “the beloved tyrant.”  He began as a swimming instructor at the Chicago Central YMCA.

He later moved to the Illinois Athletic Club (IAC).  There, Bachrach coached swimming and water polo from 1912–54. His 1914–17 IAC water polo teams won the U.S. national championship for four straight years.  At the IAC, he coached Jam Handy, Harry Hebner, Mike McDermott, Perry McGillivray, Norman Ross, Bob Skelton, Johnny Weissmuller (later famous in Hollywood as "Tarzan"), Arne Borg, Sybil Bauer, Ethel Lackie, and others.  His swimmers won 120 National AAU Championships.

Bachrach was also head coach of the 1924 Olympics and 1928 Olympics U.S. men's and women's swim teams.  His swimmers won 13 gold medals in Paris in 1924, and 10 gold medals in Amsterdam in 1928.  He developed four swimmers who won gold medals at the 1924 Olympics:  Weissmuller (100m and 200m freestyles, and 800m relay), Skelton (200m breaststroke), Lackie (100m freestyle and 400m relay), and Sybil Bauer (100m backstroke). Weissmuller also won two  gold medals at the 1928 Olympics (100m freestyle and 800m relay.  He also developed Norman Ross, who won gold medals in the 400m and 1,500m freestyles and 800m relay at the 1920 Olympics in Antwerp.

Halls of Fame
In 1994, Bachrach was inducted into the International Jewish Sports Hall of Fame.  He was inducted into the International Swimming Hall of Fame in 1996.

See also
 List of members of the International Swimming Hall of Fame

References

American swimming coaches
American water polo coaches
1879 births
1959 deaths
Jewish American sportspeople
American military personnel of the Spanish–American War
Swimming at the 1924 Summer Olympics
Swimming at the 1928 Summer Olympics
Sportspeople from Chicago
American Olympic coaches